Brewarrina (pronounced 'bree-warren-ah'; locally known as "Bre") is a town in north-west New South Wales, Australia on the banks of the Barwon River in Brewarrina Shire. The name Brewarrina is derived from 'burru waranha', a Weilwan name for a species of Acacia, Cassia tree, "Acacia clumps", "a native standing" or "place where wild gooseberry grows". The population of Brewarrina in 2016 was 1,143. Other towns and villages in the Brewarrina district include: Goodooga, Gongolgon, Weilmoringle and Angledool.

History

 
The town is located amid the traditional lands of the Muruwari, Ngemba, Weilwan and Yualwarri peoples. The area has a long Indigenous Australian history and was once the meeting ground for over 5,000 people.

The first settlers arrived in the district around 1839–40. The first people to own land where the town now stands were the Lawson brothers, who had two holdings - one called "Walcha" and another called "Moona" The town was first known as "Walcha Hut" but this later changed to "Brewarrina".

In 1859, somewhere between 300 and 400 Aboriginal people were massacred by white settlers in an event known as the Hospital Creek Massacre, recollections of which vary. A memorial was erected by the local Aboriginal Land Council near the site of the massacre.

In 1859 a riverboat called Gemini, skippered by William Randell, reached the town. This opened the possibility of developing the town as a port, and by the early 1860s Brewarrina was recognised as the furthest navigable point on the Darling River. Brewarrina became a port for shipping wool to Adelaide via the Darling and Murray rivers. The town was formally surveyed and laid out in 1861 and proclaimed on 28 April 1863.

The paddle steamer Wandering Jew of 66 tonnes, 22 × 4.4 × 1.5 m, was built in 1866 and registered at Sydney. On 15 December 1914, Wandering Jew was lost due to a fire on Barwon River, Brewarrina. "The Wandering Jew represents an earlier maritime era and provides a direct link to the riverine heritage of Brewarrina. Its colourful history and repeated damage by fire is evocative of the dramas associated with riverboat travel".

The 1870s were something of a boom time for Brewarrina. The courthouse was built in 1871. The Telegraph reached town in 1873. The Mechanics Institute formed in 1873. The following year two hotels, two stores and the Commercial Bank all opened, and in 1875 The Parish of Brewarrina was formed and public school was opened. All this development was largely due to Cobb and Co, which had a number of coach services passing through the town. There was a service from Byrock, one from Dubbo via Warren and, in 1874, a direct service from Brewarrina to Enngonia, north of Bourke. The number of people moving through the town at this time would have been considerable and would have given rise to the increase in stores and hotels.

The Barwon Bridge opened in 1888, the previous method of crossing the Barwon River was by punt and pontoon. The impetus for Brewarrina bridge, was to capture the New South Wales wool trade from the river paddle steamers and direct it away from Melbourne and Adelaide to Sydney. It is a rare bridge because it, and the lift bridge at North Bourke, are the only surviving examples of the first series of lift bridges in New South Wales. The bridge has been assessed as being of state significance and is listed on the NSW State Heritage Register.

In 1901 the Brewarrina railway line opened to Brewarrina from Byrock, on the Nyngan to Bourke line.  The Brewarrina Line closed in 1974, and the wood-framed Brewarrina Station burned to the ground in 1980. The local telephone exchange was established in 1913. The town was surveyed in 1920. Brewarrina was used as a location for the Australian silent film Moora Neya, or The Message of the Spear (1911).

The Brewarrina Ngemba Billabong has a strong cultural history. From 1876 to 1967 the Ngemba Billabong was the Brewarrina Aboriginal Mission for local Aboriginal people, whose land had been taken for grazing. The entire 261 hectare property is listed on the NSW State Heritage Register. The Brewarrina Aboriginal Mission was the oldest institutional-type community in the state, it ran until 1965. Brewarrina Mission was the first institution formally established by the Aborigines Protection Board as part of its policy to segregate Aboriginal people.

On 15 August 1987 Brewarrina erupted into a riot, later known as the Brewarrina riot, triggered by the death in police custody of Lloyd James Boney. This came a few days after the announcement by Prime Minister Bob Hawke of a Royal Commission into Aboriginal Deaths in Custody, on 10 August 1987. Both the riot and the five-year trials that followed were widely covered by the press.

Yetta Dhinnakkal Centre, a minimum-security outdoor prison for young Indigenous men that ran an award-winning program, opened in 2000 and closed in 2020.

Heritage listings 

Brewarrina has a number of heritage-listed sites, including:
 Brewarrina Aboriginal Fish Traps
 The Old Mission Road: Brewarrina Aboriginal Mission Site

Ancient Aboriginal fish traps

Brewarrina's most significant feature is its Aboriginal fish traps. Known in the local Aboriginal language as Baiame's Ngunnhu. It is believed that Ngemba, Wonkamurra, Wailwan and Gomolaroi people have shared and maintained the traps for thousands of years. The age of the fish traps is currently unknown, but they may be the oldest human construction in the world. Locals claim that the traps are at least 40,000 years old and thus the oldest surviving human-made structure in the world.

Consisting of river stones arranged to form small channels, the traps direct fish into small areas from which they are readily plucked. The traps form a complex net of linked weirs and ponds along 500m of the river. They operate at varying water heights and can be altered to suit seasonal changes. People use their expert knowledge of fish species and the environment to maximise their catch. Brewarrina Ngemba Billabong has been declared a World Conservation Union (IUCN) Category V and VI protected area. It was declared an Indigenous Protected Area in November 2010. The ready availability of fish made Brewarrina one of the great intertribal meeting places of pre-European eastern Australia.

Climate

Weather radar station

The Brewarrina radar station at the local airport was constructed from July 2020 to provide better weather forecasts for the area and farming community.

Sport and recreation 

The townspeople of Brewarrina play a variety of sports. The town has a local rugby union club and team, the Brewarrina Brumbies, and a number of rugby league teams. Local players Alby Carr, Ron Gibbs, Les Biles, Isaac Gordon and cousin Ashley Gordon played first grade in the National Rugby League. Netball is played weekly, with over 12 teams playing in the local competition. The Brewarrina Golf Club is renowned throughout the western region as one of the best 'oiled' green golf courses. Other major sports include lawn bowls, shooting, tennis and swimming. The river is also used for swimming and water skiing in the summer months.  A skate park is near the town centre.  

The Brewarrina Circus Skills Training Project is a 2004 program, which trains local kids skills in circus acts and gives them the opportunity to travel across the country to places like Adelaide and Melbourne. The Brewarrina Youth Circus was a partnership with the Brewarrina Council and Brewarrina Central School with objectives to increase school attendance. This program has also given particular kids the chance to travel overseas, with one girl travelling to South Africa to perform in the art of circus skills.

Events 

Brewarrina plays host to one of the most famous rodeos in the far west of New South Wales. The Brewarrina Show and Rodeo Society runs a successful annual rodeo program which attracts a large crowd to town. Unfortunately over the last number of years, the Brewarrina Show has not been held.

The Brewarrina Races are an important race meet in the district hosted by the Brewarrina Jockey Club. The race meet is usually held in May and has a large prize pool, complete with an extensive race program, fashions on the field, as well as other novelty races and lucky door prizes.

In more recent years, Brewarrina has played host to the Brewarrina Field Day, which came about as an event for people from the district to have a day out in the time after devastating drought. It showcases over 70 stalls, wildlife and agricultural exhibits, quick shear competitions, carnival rides, dog jumping trials, as well as food and bar stalls.

The Bre Big Fish is an annual fishing competition run over the June public holiday long weekend. It is hosted by the Brewarrina Fishing Club and draws many fishing, hunting and camping enthusiasts to the district.

In bygone years, Brewarrina was well renowned for its annual "Festival of the Fisheries", which celebrated Brewarrina's Aboriginal and European History. Brewarrina also hosted the unique "Surfboat Classic", which attracted a number of Surf Life Saving Clubs from the New South Wales Coast. Unfortunately these events have not been held in recent years.

In April 2013, Brewarrina celebrated the 150th year since it was gazetted as a town in 1863. This was celebrated by a week long festival which included: Brewarrina Race Club meeting with over 2000 attendees, Bre Big Fish Competition, street parade and carnival, film festival, historical exhibitions, black tie ball, fireworks display, flower and cake show, as well as a number of celebratory sporting fixtures including rugby league and rugby union exhibition matches, clay target shooting and bowling competition.

Notable citizens

 Jimmie Barker, first Indigenous published author. The two worlds of Jimmie Barker: The life of an Australian Aboriginal, 1900-1972 / as told to Janet Mathews.

 Mervyn Bishop (1945–), news and documentary photographer. Mervyn won 'News photographer of the Year Award' for Life and Death Dash, the 1971 front page of the Sydney Morning Herald.

 Essie Coffey (1941–1998), community worker, singer, actor and film maker.  Co-founder of the Western Aboriginal Legal Service.  

 Ron Gibbs (1962–), 1980s/1990s Australian rugby league footballer. 

 Ashley Gordon, 1990s Australian rugby league footballer. 

 Isaac Gordon (1986–), 2010s Australian rugby league footballer. 

 Leo Schofield (1935–), restaurant critic, advertising professional and arts festival director.

 Albert George Henry Why (1899–1969), known as Alby Carr, an Australian rugby league footballer.

Education

 Gainmara Birrilee Pre-School
 Brewarrina Central School (Kindergarten to Grade 12) 
 St Patrick's Catholic School (Kindergarten to Grade 6) 
 TAFE Western, Brewarrina College

Gallery

References

External links

 
Towns in New South Wales
River ports of Australia
Murray-Darling basin
IUCN Category VI
IUCN Category V
Protected areas of New South Wales
Far West (New South Wales)
Brewarrina Shire